Joseph Boyamba (born 29 July 1996) is a German professional footballer who plays as a winger for  club 1860 Munich.

Career
Boyamba joined Waldhof Mannheim of the 3. Liga in 2020. He made his professional debut for the club in the first round of the 2020–21 DFB-Pokal on 13 September 2020, coming on as a substitute in the 63rd minute for Jan-Hendrik Marx against Bundesliga side SC Freiburg, which finished as a 2–1 home loss.

On 17 June 2022, Boyamba signed with 1860 Munich.

References

External links
 
 
 
 
 

1996 births
Living people
People from Troisdorf
Sportspeople from Cologne (region)
Footballers from North Rhine-Westphalia
German footballers
Citizens of the Democratic Republic of the Congo through descent
Democratic Republic of the Congo footballers
German sportspeople of Democratic Republic of the Congo descent
Association football wingers
FC Schalke 04 II players
BSV Schwarz-Weiß Rehden players
SG Wattenscheid 09 players
Borussia Dortmund II players
SV Waldhof Mannheim players
TSV 1860 Munich players
3. Liga players
Regionalliga players